Hilarion-Pit Lessard (1913-1984) was a Canadian politician.  He was a five-term Member of the House of Commons and was a City Councillor in Montreal, Quebec.

Background
He was born in Sainte-Germaine, Quebec on February 11, 1913.

Federal Politics
Lessard successfully ran as a Liberal candidate in the district of Saint-Henri in 1958.  He was re-elected in 1962, 1963 and 1965.  He ran in the district of Lasalle in 1968 and won.  He did not run for re-election in 1972.

City Councillor
He was elected to Montreal's City Council as an Independent candidate in 1957.  He was re-elected in 1960 and 1962.  He lost his bid for re-election in 1966, against Civic candidate Guy Lacoste.  He represented the district of Saint-Henri.

Death
Pit Lessard died on September 10, 1984 due to heart failure.

Footnotes

External links
 

1913 births
1984 deaths
Liberal Party of Canada MPs
Members of the House of Commons of Canada from Quebec
Montreal city councillors